Sthenias madurae is a species of beetle in the family Cerambycidae. It was described by Boppe in 1914. It is known from India.

References

madurae
Beetles described in 1914